Roy M. Takumi (born October 13, 1952 in Honolulu, Hawaii) is an American politician and a Democratic member of the Hawaii House of Representatives since January 16, 2013 representing District 35. Takumi consecutively served from January 1993 until 2013 in the District 36 seat. From 2002-2017, Takumi chaired the House Committee on Education.

Education
Takumi earned his BA in education from Long Island University and his MA in public administration from the University of Hawaii.

Elections
1992 Takumi won the three-way September 19, 1992 Democratic Primary with 1,441 votes (54.5%), and was unopposed for the November 3, 1992 General election.
1994 Takumi was unopposed for both the September 17, 1994 Democratic Primary, winning with 2,589 votes, and the November 8, 1994 General election.
1996 Takumi won the three-way September 21, 1996 Democratic Primary with 1,877 votes (48.1%), and won the November 5, 1996 General election with 3,968 votes (72.9%) against Republican nominee Holly Kuehu.
1998 Takumi won the September 19, 1998 Democratic Primary by 8 votes with 1,310 votes (48.8%) against Alex Sonson, and won the November 3, 1998 General election with 4,859 votes (76.4%) against Republican nominee John Nuusa.
2000 Takumi won the September 23, 2000 Democratic Primary with 1,987 votes (49.9%) in a rematch against his 1998 primary opponent Alex Sonson, and Republican John Nuusa was unopposed for his primary, setting up a rematch in the general election; Takumi won the November 5, 2002 General election with 3,968 votes (72.6%) against Nuusa; Sonson and Nuusa faced each other directly in the District 35 2002 General election, with Takumi serving alongside Sonson from 2003 until 2009.
2002 Takumi won the September 21, 2002 Democratic Primary with 2,601 votes (58.0%), and won the November 5, 2002 General election with 5,649 votes (65.7%) against Republican nominee Chris Prendergast.
2004 Takumi was unopposed for the September 18, 2004 Democratic Primary, winning with 3,848 votes, and won the November 2, 2004 General election with 6,689 votes (75.1%) against Republican nominee Jamie Kese.
2006 Takumi was unopposed for the September 26, 2006 Democratic Primary, winning with 4,395 votes, and won the November 7, 2006 General election with 5,721 votes (76.8%) against Republican nominee Jerilyn Anderton.
2008 Takumi was unopposed for the September 20, 2008 Democratic Primary, winning with 3,481 votes, and won the November 4, 2008 General election with 6,903 votes (77.4%) against a nonpartisan candidate, who received 61.
2010 Takumi was unopposed for the September 18, 2010 Democratic Primary, winning with 4,144 votes, and won the November 2, 2010 General election with 4,806 votes (59.8%) against Republican nominee Reed Shiraki.
2012 Redistricted to District 35, and with Democratic Representative Henry Aquino redistricted to District 38, Takumi was unopposed for both the August 11, 2012 Democratic Primary, winning with 3,262 votes, and the November 6, 2012 General election.

References

External links
Official page at the Hawaii State Legislature
 

1952 births
Living people
Long Island University alumni
Democratic Party members of the Hawaii House of Representatives
Politicians from Honolulu
University of Hawaiʻi alumni
21st-century American politicians
Hawaii politicians of Japanese descent